In Space is the fourth and final studio album by American rock group Big Star, released in 2005. It was the first new Big Star studio recording since Third/Sister Lovers, recorded in 1974 and released in 1978.

The album features original Big Star members Alex Chilton and Jody Stephens, with two more recent recruits, Jon Auer and Ken Stringfellow. Auer and Stringfellow had been members of The Posies before joining Big Star in 1993 for sporadic live performances and tours.

In Space features new original material by the four members, plus a cover of "Mine Exclusively" – originally recorded by The Olympics in 1966 – and a new arrangement of "Aria, Lago" by Baroque composer Georg Muffat. One Alex Chilton song, "Hot Thing," was originally recorded by the band in 1997 as its contribution to the tribute album Big Star, Small World, a project delayed by a succession of record label failures before its eventual release in 2006.

Track listing

Personnel
Big Star
Jon Auer – guitar, vocals
Alex Chilton – guitar, vocals
Jody Stephens – drums, vocals
Ken Stringfellow – bass guitar, vocals, keyboards
with:
 Jim Spake – saxophone ("Dony", "Love Revolution", "Do You Wanna Make It" and "Makeover")
 Nokie Taylor – cornet ("Love Revolution")
Technical
 Jeff Powell – producer, mixing
 Adam Hill – assistant engineer

References

Big Star albums
2005 albums
Rykodisc albums